Sons of the Soil (Danish: Borgslægtens historie, Icelandic: Saga Borgarættarinnar) is a Danish film directed and shot by Gunnar Sommerfeldt in Iceland in 1919, based on the novel by Gunnar Gunnarsson. It was released in 1920, and it was the first film shot in Iceland.

Cast
Philip Bech – Vivild, banker
Stefanía Guðmundsdóttir   
Guðmundur Thorsteinsson – Ormar Örlygsson
Elisabet Jacobsen – Snæbjörg 
Frederik Jacobsen – Örlyg 
Ove Kuhl – Örn 
Karen Poulsen
Gunnar Sommerfeldt – Ketill 
Inge Sommerfeldt – Danish girl 
Ingeborg Spangsfeldt – Rúna

References

External links 
 

Films shot in Iceland
1920 films
Danish silent films
Danish black-and-white films